Phenylobacterium conjunctum is a Gram negative, rod-shaped and non-spore-forming bacterium from the genus of Phenylobacterium which has been isolated from water biofilm from Vancouver in Canada.

References

Caulobacterales
Bacteria described in 2008